Nevelsky District is the name of several administrative and municipal districts in Russia:
Nevelsky District, Pskov Oblast, an administrative and municipal district of Pskov Oblast
Nevelsky District, Sakhalin Oblast, an administrative district of Sakhalin Oblast

See also
Nevelsky (disambiguation)

References